Marocconus is an extinct genus from a well-known class of fossil marine arthropods, the trilobites. It is still debated if it lived at the very end of the Lower Cambrian or at the very beginning of the Middle Cambrian. Marocconus notabilis is the only known species in this genus (i.e. the genus is monotypic).

Taxonomy 
Marocconus replaces Cephalopyge Geyer, 1988, which is a junior homonym of Cephalopyge Hanel, 1905, a nudibranch. Cephalopyge however, is still widely used for this trilobite, and the new name Marocconus has only been mentioned one time in the scientific literature.

Distribution 
Marocconus notabilis is known from the latest Lower Cambrian or earliest Middle Cambrian of Morocco (Jbel Wawrmast Formation, Anti-Atlas Mountains).

Ecology 
Marocconus notabilis occurs in the same layers a Cambropallas telesto.

Description 
Like all Agnostida, Marocconus is diminutive and the headshield (or cephalon) and tailshield (or pygidium) are of approximately the same size (or isopygous) and outline. Like all Weymouthiidae, it lacks eyes and rupture lines (or sutures). The cephalon is subcircular except for the straight posterior. The external surface of the cephalon is smooth, convex, and is hanging over an extremely narrow border. The central raised area of the cephalon (or glabella) is evident on the internal mold by a clear defining furrow, long triangular in outline (about 1⅓× as long as the maximum width), with rounded tips and only one transverse furrow (SO). The occipital ring (LO) is short (measured along the length of the animal), and hangs over the posterior margin. The thorax has three segments, like all other Weymouthiidae for which the thorax is known. The pygidium is also externally smooth, and convex. The internal mold shows a long triangular axis, narrower than the glabella (about 1⅓× as long as the maximum width), with rounded tips extending to the posterior margin, and without visible segmentation. The pygidium has no border furrow.

References 

Weymouthiidae
Agnostida genera
Cambrian trilobites
Fossils of Morocco
Animals described in 1988